The 2013–14 Texas–Arlington Mavericks men's basketball team represented the University of Texas at Arlington during the 2013–14 NCAA Division I men's basketball season. The Mavericks, led by eighth year head coach Scott Cross, played their home games at the College Park Center and were first year members of the Sun Belt Conference. They finished the season 15–17, 9–9 in Sun Belt play to finish in a tie for fifth place. They advanced to the quarterfinals of the Sun Belt Conference tournament where they lost to Louisiana–Lafayette.

Roster

Schedule

|-
!colspan=9 style="background:#0064b1; color:#f58025;"| Regular season

|-
!colspan=9 style="background:#0064b1; color:#f58025;"| Sun Belt tournament

Notes

References

UT Arlington Mavericks men's basketball seasons
Texas-Arlington
2013 in sports in Texas
2014 in sports in Texas